Yury Vasilyevich Yakovlev (25 April 1928 – 30 November 2013) was a Soviet and Russian actor. He was awarded the honorary title of People's Artist of the USSR in 1976.

Main works 

Yury Yakovlev is best known for his roles in late Soviet film, particularly for his roles in Eldar Ryazanov's and Leonid Gaidai's comedies. Yakovlev's most popular comedic roles in Eldar Ryazanov's films are Poruchik Rzhevsky in Hussar Ballad (1962), Ippolit in The Irony of Fate (1976), and comic roles of the tsar Ivan the Terrible and his namesake Ivan Vasilevich Bunsha in Leonid Gaidai's comedy Ivan Vasilievich: Back to the Future (1973). He also played dramatic roles, such as inimitable complicated psychological role of the Prince Myshkin in The Idiot (1958), and other cinema roles (Dangerous turn, Earthly Love movies). He was the leading artist of the Vakhtangov Theater during its heyday.

Life and career

The early years 
From a young age he was fond of acting and theatre. At the turn of the 1940s, he studied acting at Shchukin Theatrical School of Vakhtangov Theatre in Moscow starting to work as an actor at Vakhtangov Theatre.

Theatrical career 
Yakovlev joined the ensemble of the Vakhtangov Theatre in 1952. He played over seventy roles onstage, including Casanova in Three Ages of Casanova, Duke Bolingbroke in Glass of Water, and Prokofiev in Lessons of Master.

Film career 
Yakovlev became really famous as a cinema actor in 1958, after his inimitable complicated psychological role of the Prince Myshkin in The Idiot directed by Ivan Pyryev. He achieved international fame playing the role as Prince Myshkin. Yakovlev made his first appearance in an Eldar Ryazanov comedy in 1961, in The Man From Nowhere. Yakovlev followed his first success with regular appearances in Ryazanov's comedies, most notably splendid film Hussar Ballad in 1962, in which he played phantasmagoric role of Poruchik Rzhevsky. The feature was such a resounding success that Rzhevsky's character gave rise to innumerable Russian jokes.

In the 1960s and 1970s, Yakovlev branched out into further various roles, from the nobleman Stiva Oblonsky in the 1967 adaptation, the classic Soviet movie adaptation of Tolstoy's Anna Karenina, directed by Alexander Zarkhi, to jealous fiancé Ippolit in Ryazanov's The Irony of Fate. Perhaps his most famous roles were the tsar Ivan the Terrible and his namesake Ivan Vasilevich Bunsha in Leonid Gaidai's 1973 comedy Ivan Vasilievich: Back to the Future - the movie about the travel using the time machine (based on the play Ivan Vasilievich (play) by Mikhail Bulgakov).

Decline in popularity 
His participation in two-part film "Love Earth" and "Destiny" - a series of movies about the World War II brought him the USSR State Prize for 1979. His film career effectively came to a halt after the role of the alien Bi in Georgiy Daneliya’s 1986 sci-fi comedy Kin-dza-dza! where he starred alongside Yevgeny Leonov and Stanislav Lyubshin. The last role in Ikno was the role in the film The Irony of Fate 2 (Ирония судьбы. Продолжение) as Ippolit Georgievich.

Death 
Yakovlev felt ill in early morning of 29 November 2013. He soon fainted in his home. He was rushed to a Moscow hospital where he died there on 30 November 2013 from heart failure, aged 85. On the same day, the death of Yuri Yakovlev was reported by RIA Novosti to Times.am 'with reference to the theater's press service. 

RIA News posted that day the information:

Bibliography 
In 1997, the publishing house Art (Iskusstvo) published a book by Yakovlev entitled Album of my destiny

Selected filmography 

1953: The Great Warrior Skanderbeg as Warrior
1956: Early Joys (Первые радости) as Vasily Dibich, lieutenant
1957: No Ordinary Summer (Необыкновенное лето) as Vasily Dibich, lieutenant
1957: Pervye radosti as Dibich (uncredited)
1958: The Idiot (Идиот) as Prince Myshkin
1958: Wind (Ветер) as Leonid Zakrewsky, lieutenant
1959: Gorod na zare as Altman
1959: Ballad of a Soldier (Баллада о солдате) as narrator (uncredited)
1960: Zare navstrechu as Pyotr Sapozhkov
1961: Nowhere Man (Человек ниоткуда) as Vladimir Porazhaev
1962: Hussar Ballad (Гусарская баллада) as Lieutenant Dmitry Rzhevsky
1963: Bolshaya doroga as Polivanov
1964: Summer Is Over as Narrator (voice, uncredited)
1964: An Easy Life (Легкая жизнь) as Alexander P. Bochkin, underground businessman
1964: Russkiy les as German Officer Walter Kittel
1966: Beware of the Car (Берегись автомобиля) as narrator (voice)
1966: Friends and Years (Друзья и годы) as Yuri Derzhavin
1967: A Pistol Shot (Выстрел) as count
1967: Anna Karenina (Анна Каренина) as Stiva Oblonsky
1968: Crash (Крах) as Andrey Pavlovich Fyodorov
1969: Subject for a Short Story as Potapenko
1970: Korol-olen as Deramo
1970: Sinyaya ptitsa (voice)
1972: The Seagull (Чайка) as Boris Alexeyevich Trigorin, writer
1972: Grandads-Robbers (Старики-разбойники) as narrator (voice)
1973: Skhvatka as Joachim
1973: Ivan Vasilievich: Back to the Future (Иван Васильевич меняет профессию) as Ivan the Terrible / Ivan Vasilievich Bunsha, building superintendent
1973: Much Ado About Nothing (Много шума из ничего) (TV Movie) (uncredited)
1975: Earthly Love (Любовь земная) as Tikhon Bruchanov, Secretary of district committee of Communist Party
1975: The Irony of Fate (Ирония судьбы, или С лёгким паром!) (TV Mini-Series) as Ippolit Georgievich
1977: Destiny (Судьба) as Tikhon Bruchanov, Secretary of district committee of Communist Party
1978: Yuliya Vrevskaya as Nikolai Nikolaevich
1978: Pravo pervoy podpisi as Narrator (voice)
1979: Barkhatnyy sezon
1980: Poema o krylyakh as Igor Sikorskiy
1981: An Ideal Husband (Идеальный муж) as Sir Robert Chiltern
1982: Carnival (Карнавал) as Mikhail Solomatin, father of Nina
1982: Beshenye dengi as Ivan Telyatyev
1986: Kin-dza-dza! (Кин-дза-дза!) as Bee - the wandering Patsak singer
1986: Vremya synovey
1987: Levsha
1987: Izbrannik sudby as Narrator (voice)
1988: Shtany
1988: Treasure Island as Ben Gunn (voice)
1990: A Trap for Lonely Man as Police inspector
1991: Sem dney posle ubiystva
1992: Plashchanitsa Aleksandra Nevskogo
1992: Tantsuyushchiye prizraki
1992: Gardemarines-III (Гардемарины-III) as Stepan Fyodorovich Apraksin
1992: Davayte bez fokusov!... as Ot avtora
1993: Children of Iron Gods (Дети чугунных богов) as general
1993: Supermen ponevole ili eroticheskiy mutant
1999: East/West as Vieil Homme Kommonalka
2007: The Irony of Fate 2 (Ирония судьбы. Продолжение) as Ippolit Georgievich (final film role)

Honors and awards
Honorary Member of the Russian Academy of Arts
Honored Artist of the RSFSR (1961)
People's Artist of the RSFSR (1968)
People's Artist of the USSR (1976)
Order "For Merit to the Fatherland":
2nd class (10 June 2008) - for outstanding contributions to the development of domestic theatrical and cinematic arts, many years of creative activity
3rd class (17 October 1996) - for services to the State and outstanding contribution to the development of theatrical arts
Order of Lenin (1988)
Order of the Red Banner of Labour (1978)
USSR State Prize (1979) - for his role Tikhon Ivanovich Bryukhanova in two-part film "Love Earth" and "Destiny"
Stanislavsky State Prize of the RSFSR (1970) - for his performance as Yegor Dmitrievich Glumova in the play "The Wise Man Stumbles" by Alexander Ostrovsky
State Prize of the Russian Federation in Literature and Art in 1994 (29 May 1995) - for the performance of the State Academic Theatre named Eugene. Vakhtangov "Guilty Without Guilt" on the play by Alexander Ostrovsky
Russian Federation President Prize in Literature and Art in 2003 (13 February 2004) - for outstanding creative and scientific contribution to the artistic culture of Russia
Golden Mask Awards, awarded with "Silver Mask" for best actor (Salvador Allende, "Unfinished Dialogue") (1976)
Gold Medal for AP Dovzhenko film Destiny (1978)
Crystal Turandot Award (1998)
Prize of the business community, "Idol" for high service to art (1999)
Chekhov Medal (2010)

References

External links

Yakovlev on the Vakhtangov Theatre Homepage
Biography of Yury Yakovlev 

1928 births
2013 deaths
20th-century Russian male actors
21st-century Russian male actors
Honorary Members of the Russian Academy of Arts
Honored Artists of the RSFSR
People's Artists of the RSFSR
People's Artists of the USSR
Recipients of the Order "For Merit to the Fatherland", 2nd class
Recipients of the Order "For Merit to the Fatherland", 3rd class
Recipients of the Order of Lenin
Recipients of the Order of the Red Banner of Labour
Recipients of the USSR State Prize
State Prize of the Russian Federation laureates
Russian male film actors
Russian male stage actors
Russian male television actors
Russian male voice actors
Russian memoirists
Soviet male film actors
Soviet male stage actors
Soviet male television actors
Soviet male voice actors
Soviet memoirists
Burials at Novodevichy Cemetery